The Taskan is a river in the Susuman and Yagodninsky districts of Magadan Oblast, Russia. It is a left hand tributary of the Kolyma. The Taskan was first mapped in the 19th century by explorer Jan Czerski. 

Perch, ruffe, gudgeon and burbot are found in the waters of the river.

Course 
It heads roughly southeastwards across permafrost terrain covered by tundra vegetation interspersed with sparse taiga. Finally it joins the left bank of the Kolyma between the Kolyma Dam and the Ust-Srednekan Dam,  from its mouth.

The Taskan is located in a sparsely-populated region of severe cold winters. Its main tributaries are the Mylga and the Sudar. The only populated places by the river were the now abandoned villages of Taskan and Elgen, as well as the also abandoned Ust-Taskan settlement located at the confluence with the Kolyma. The river usually freezes in early October and stays frozen until May. The highest water flow is between mid-May to June in average years.

See also
List of rivers of Russia

References

External links
Ust-Srednekan hydroelectric power plant

Rivers of Magadan Oblast